R-Z18 is a subclade of the R-U106 branch of Haplogroup R.

It includes all men who have the single nucleotide polymorphism (SNP) designated Z18 in their Y chromosome.  

Z18, also called S493, is defined to be mutation in which the nucleotide at position 14,991,735 along the Y chromosome has mutated from guanine (G) to adenine (A).  

Z18 was discovered during Phase 3 of the 1000 Genomes Project, and entered on 16 August 2014 into the SNP database dbSNP at the National Center for Biotechnology Information as reference SNP cluster report rs767290651. 

R-U106 is one of the major sub groups of R1b in coastal Western Europe, but Z18 is only about 5-10% of U106.  

R-Z18 has its highest concentrations in Scandinavia, but is also found throughout areas of Germanic migration, including the Low Countries, Central Europe, and the British Isles. The likely Scandinavian origins of R-Z18 are bolstered by the dominance of Scandinavian individuals among ancient DNA samples. These consist of individuals found in Sweden, Norway, and Iceland; settlers in Orkney and the Isle of Man; executed Scandinavians found in Oxfordshire and Dorset; and a Lombard individual found in what is now Hungary.

On the basis of genetic results, the first carrier of this mutation lived around 2200 B.C., with a 90% confidence range of 3000 B.C. to 1400 B.C.

Major known subclades of R-Z18 include R-ZP156, R-S11601, R-DF95, R-FGC7637, R-Z2396, R-S6119 and R-Z17.  although they continue to increase as more are found.
Atlantic Modal Haplotype
Genealogical DNA test
Haplogroup R1b
Human Y-chromosome DNA haplogroup
Prehistoric Europe
Y-DNA haplogroups in populations of Europe

References

External links
L257 A North Sea Tribe 

R-Z18
R